Acid attacks in the United Kingdom have been on the rise for some time, with London being called the "acid attack hotspot of the Western world."

Prevalence 
Acid attacks have been on the rise in the United Kingdom, particularly in London, in the past twenty years. In 2012, 78 attacks were reported in London, and the number peaked at 472 attacks in 2017, before falling to 310 attacks in 2018 and ultimately, 123 attacks in 2019. Such attacks often target young men and moped drivers.

Substances 
Sulfuric acid and hydrochloric acid are commonly used substances in acid attacks. The use of ammonia has also been reported.

Notable incidents

2017

Jameel Mukhtar and Resham Khan 
Jameel Mukhtar, 37-years-old, and Resham Khan, 21-years-old, were attacked by John Tomlin, 24-years-old, of Canning Town, on 21 June 2017 in Beckton (London). Mukhtar and Khan, cousins, of Asian and Islamic background, had been out celebrating Khan's 21st birthday, when Tomlin began yelling at the two from the sidewalk. After a brief exchange, Tomlin approached the vehicle and sprayed Khan, the passenger, with a corrosive liquid. Mukhtar, the driver, was unable to drive away, as the cars around him had stopped for the traffic light. He turned the car around in an effort to flee the attack only for Tomlin to then spray him with the same corrosive liquid he had Khan. Footage from a nearby security camera showed Tomlin running alongside the vehicle as Mukhtar attempted to drive away, spraying him until he could no longer keep up. Unable to see as the substance affected his vision, Mukhtar crashed the vehicle and dragged Khan from the car, begging for help from those nearby. Tomlin fled the scene but was ultimately arrested and charged with two counts of grievous bodily harm and later on, a hate crime. In an interview with police, Tomlin claimed to have heard voices in his head. Tomlin later pleaded guilty to the two counts of grievous bodily harm and was sentenced to 16 years imprisonment for each count, to run concurrently, of which he must serve at least 10 years before being eligible for release. Mukhtar, who had to be placed in a medically induced coma, suffered permanent hearing and vision loss from the attack and both he and Khan had to undergo skin grafting. Mukhtar further expressed his disappointment at the sentencing Tomlin received, believing he should've received a life sentence, as the attack had rendered him jobless, scarred, and in constant pain. He also said he believed the attack was motivated by Islamophobia.

Jabed Hussain 
Jabed Hussain, 33-years-old, was riding his moped home from work on 13 July 2017 when Derryck John, 17-years-old, of Croydon, attacked him with a corrosive substance in an attempt to steal his vehicle. The attack left Hussain with burns to his face and breathing issues. BBC reported that John had admitted to spraying no less than six motorists with acid over the course of 90 minutes in an effort to steal their mopeds. Hussain expressed a desire for John to receive life imprisonment. John pleaded guilty to six counts of throwing a corrosive liquid with intent to "disable, burn, maim, disfigure or cause grievous bodily harm", two counts of robbery and four counts of attempted robbery and was sentenced to 10 and a half years. Another one of his victims was left partially blind

2019 
On 8 April 2019, a British family of Chinese origin was attacked in Islington (London) by an unknown assailant. The husband and father, a 40-year-old man named Hai, his 36-year-old wife, and their 2-year-old son were sprayed with a corrosive and oxidizing substance while walking along Copenhagen Street, near Charlotte Terrace. Passersby purchased water from a nearby store to pour on the family until medical help arrived. The couple suffered burns to their hands and bodies while the child was burned on his face. No arrests were made. A friend of the family said that they believed Hai, who'd been in the United Kingdom for over 20 years, had been targeted.

References 

Acid attack victims
2010s crimes in the United Kingdom
Women's rights in the United Kingdom